Elmira is an unincorporated community in Lane County, Oregon, United States. It is located west of Eugene and north of Veneta and Oregon Route 126, near the Long Tom River and Fern Ridge Reservoir.

The community was named after Elmira, California, after previously having the name "Duckworth". A local business owner persuaded postal authorities to rename the community "Elmira" in 1884.

In approximately 1905, Elmira Road and the surrounding area was homesteaded by Henry and Celia Faulhaber along with their children Leon, Neil and Mildred. Sometime between 1905 and 1916 Elmira Road was donated back to the county by Henry Faulhaber and later renamed Faulhaber Road.

Demographics

Education
Elmira is served by the Fern Ridge School District (28J), which has four traditional schools, Elmira Elementary School, Veneta Elementary School, Fern Ridge Middle School, and Elmira High School, and an online charter high school, West Lane Technical Learning Center.

References

3. Inman, Loris. "Elmira, Oregon - A Photo Story." Lane County Historian Vol. XXIII, No. 3. Fall, 1978. http://ir.library.oregonstate.edu/xmlui/bitstream/handle/1957/10797/Vol_23_No_3_Fal_1978.pdf?sequence=1

4. Dailey, Charles. "Lane County, Oregon, West of I5 Except Eugene." Pioneer History—to about 1900, Churches of Christ and Christian Churches in the Pacific Northwest. October 9, 2009. http://ncbible.org/nwh/OrLaneWest.html

External links
 
 Fern Ridge School District
 LCC Elmira Community Learning Center

Unincorporated communities in Lane County, Oregon
1884 establishments in Oregon
Populated places established in 1884
Unincorporated communities in Oregon